Tetrastigma nitens is a species of liana native to seasonal tropical forests and gallery forests of tropical and subtropical eastern Australia.

Common names include native grape, shiny-leaved grape, and three-leaf water vine.

References

Vitaceae
Plants described in 1887
Flora of Queensland
Bushfood
Taxa named by Ferdinand von Mueller